Juncus cooperi is a species of rush known by the common name Cooper's rush. It is native to the deserts of the southwestern United States and northern Mexico, where it grows in alkaline and saline soils such as those around salt marshes and desert springs. This is a perennial herb forming large clumps of erect stems up to about 80 centimetres tall from a thick rhizome and large root network. The bases of the stems are surrounded by sparse, small leaves, which are stiff and have sharp tips. The inflorescence is a cluster of brown, pale green, or straw-colored flowers accompanied by one bract which appears as an extension of the stem.

External links
Jepson Manual Treatment
Photo gallery

cooperi
Plants described in 1868
Flora of the Southwestern United States
Flora of Mexico